Abd-Allah Mikali was an Iranian statesman from the Mikalid family, who served the Saffarids, and later the Abbasids.

Abd-Allah was the son of Muhammad ibn Mikal, a prominent Mikalid commander who served the Tahirids of Khorasan. Abd-Allah is first mentioned as a high-ranking official of the Saffarid ruler Amr ibn al-Layth. Amr was killed in 901, and was succeeded by his grandson Tahir ibn Muhammad ibn Amr. Tahir, however, was only a figurehead, while the real power was held by his uncle Al-Layth, his ghulam Sebük-eri, and by Abd-Allah himself. Sebük-eri later rebelled against Tahir, and was joined by Abd-Allah. They soon transferred their allegiance to the Abbasid Caliphate, where Abd-Allah was appointed as governor of Ahvaz. Abd-Allah died in 920, leaving a son named Abu'l-Abbas Ismail, who began serving as head of the administration of the Samanids.

References

Sources
 
 
 

Mikalids
10th-century Iranian politicians
9th-century Iranian politicians
9th-century births
920 deaths
Year of birth unknown
Governors of the Abbasid Caliphate
Saffarid generals